Kačerov is a Prague Metro station on Line C, located between Michle and Krč in Prague 4. It was opened on 9 May 1974 as the southern terminus of the first section of Prague Metro, between Sokolovská and Kačerov. On 7 November 1980, the line was extended to Kosmonautů (currently Háje).

References

Prague Metro stations
Railway stations opened in 1974
1974 establishments in Czechoslovakia
Railway stations in the Czech Republic opened in the 20th century